Angersbach, originally Angerspah, is an Old Hessian surname.

All living members of this family are perhaps descendants of the noble family von Angersbach.

Meaning of the name is as follows: 

Anger = grass covered land / middle of a Germanic tribe settlement.

res = marsh / floating water.

pah = lake.

The history of this family dates 1,200 years back into Germanic past.

See also
Wartenberg, Hesse, a Hessian community containing the village Angersbach

Surnames